The Bell Media Tower (Tour Bell Média) is a skyscraper in Montreal, Quebec, Canada. Located at 1800 McGill College Avenue, it was built for the Montreal Trust Company, and shared the name Place Montreal Trust with the adjoining mall. It stands 125 m (410 ft) and 30 storeys tall. It was originally owned by Cadillac Fairview but is now owned by Ivanhoe Cambridge. The main tenant was Astral Media, which had its corporate headquarters in the building along with several of its French-speaking television stations. In 2013, Bell acquired Astral Media, changing the tower's name to Bell Media Tower when it became regional offices for Bell Media.

See also
Place Montreal Trust
List of tallest buildings in Montreal

References

External links
 Emporis.com: Maison Astral
 SkyscraperPage.com: Maison Astral

Postmodern architecture in Canada
Office buildings completed in 1988
Skyscrapers in Montreal
Skyscraper office buildings in Canada
Bank buildings in Canada
Downtown Montreal
1988 establishments in Quebec
Bell Media